OHP may refer to:

 Haute-Provence Observatory, an astronomical observatory in the southeast of France
 Occupational health psychology, an interdisciplinary area of psychology that is concerned with the health and safety of workers
 Oklahoma Highway Patrol, a major state law enforcement agency of the government of Oklahoma
 Open House Party, an American radio show hosted on Saturday and Sunday nights by Kannon
 Open Humanities Press, an international open access publishing initiative in the humanities
 Order of the Holy Paraclete, an Anglican religious community
 Oregon Health Plan, Oregon's state Medicaid program
 Overall hemostatic potential, a global test of coagulation and fibrinolysis
 Overhead press, a weight training exercise with many variations
 Overhead projector, a device that uses light to project an enlarged image on a screen
 Oliver Hazard Perry-class Frigate, a class of guided missile frigates that were designed by US in mid-70s.
 Overhead Pole, an above ground pole used to support span wires for a tram network.